Phtheochroa ecballiella is a species of moth of the family Tortricidae. It is found in Portugal, Spain and on the Canary Islands.

The wingspan is 15–21 mm. Adults have been recorded on wing from June to July.

References

Moths described in 1989
Phtheochroa